Hipponix antiquatus is a species of small limpet-like sea snail, a marine gastropod mollusk in the family Hipponicidae, the hoof snails.

Distribution

Description 
The maximum recorded shell length is 20 mm.

Habitat 
Minimum recorded depth is 0 m. Maximum recorded depth is 525 m.

References

External links

Hipponicidae
Gastropods described in 1767
Taxa named by Carl Linnaeus